The Filmfare Best Costumes Award is given by the Filmfare magazine as part of its annual Filmfare Awards for Hindi films.

Dolly Ahluwalia holds a record won maximum 3 awards.

List
Here is a list of the award winners and the films for which they won.

See also 
 Filmfare Awards
 Bollywood
 Cinema of India

Costume Design
Awards for film costume design